The Women's field hockey tournament at the 2019 Pan American Games will be the 9th edition of the field hockey event for women at the Pan American Games. It will take place over a twelve-day period beginning on 29 July, and culminated with the medal finals on 9 August.

The winner of this tournament will qualify for the 2020 Summer Olympics in Tokyo, Japan.

Qualification
A total of eight women's teams qualified to compete at the games. The host nation (Peru) received automatic qualification. The top two teams at the 2018 Central American and Caribbean Games and 2018 South American Games also qualified. The top two teams not yet qualified from the 2017 Pan American Cup (after the results from the above two tournaments are taken into account) also qualified. If Canada and/or the United States have not qualified still, a playoff between the nations and the third-ranked at the Pan American Cups will take place. If both nations do qualify, the playoff will be not necessary and the third placed team at each Pan American Cup will qualify.
The Pan American Hockey Federation (PAHF) officially announced the qualified teams on 10 September 2018.

Summary

Rosters

Results
The official schedule was revealed on 10 January 2019.

All times are local (UTC−5).

Preliminary round

Pool A

Pool B

Classification round

Bracket

Quarter-finals

Fifth to eighth place classification

Cross-overs

Seventh and eighth place

Fifth and sixth place

Semi-finals

Bronze medal match

Gold medal match

Statistics

Final standings

 Qualified for the 2020 Summer Olympics

Goalscorers

References

 
Women
Pan American Games
2019
2019 Pan American Games